The Samuel Islands are a group of small islands and rocks lying close to the south coast of South Georgia, 1.6 km (1 mile) west-southwest of Nilse Hullet and 3.2 km (2 miles) east-southeast of Klutschak Point. Surveyed by the SGS in the period 1951–57. Named by the United Kingdom Antarctic Place-Names Committee (UK-APC) after the catcher Don Samuel, built in 1925 and later owned by the Compania Argentina de Pesca, Grytviken, which sank in the vicinity of these islands in 1951.

See also 
 List of Antarctic and sub-Antarctic islands

Islands of South Georgia